The Collegiate Peaks (or Collegiate Range) is a name given to a section of the Sawatch Range of the Rocky Mountains located in central Colorado. Drainages to the east include headwaters of the Arkansas River.

The Collegiate Peaks include some of the highest mountains in the Rockies. The section is so named because several of the mountains are named for prominent universities.

Prominent peaks

See also

Mountain peaks of Colorado
Collegiate Peaks Wilderness

References

External links
 

Mountain ranges of Colorado
Rocky Mountains
Landforms of Chaffee County, Colorado
Landforms of Pitkin County, Colorado